Tohar Butbul (born 24 January 1994) is an Israeli judoka. He competes in the under 73 kg weight category, where he won silver medals at the 2019 Judo World Masters and the 2021 European Championships, and won bronze medals in the 2017 Paris Grand Slam and 2017 Abu Dhabi Grand Slam. As of March 2018 he was ranked #9 in the world in the U73 kg division.

Judo career
Butbul started training in judo when he was five years old at Oren Smadja's school. On September 19, 2014, Butbul took part in the under 21 European championship which was held in Bucharest and won the bronze medal after defeating Nuno Saraiva of Portugal on the medal match.

Butbul's first medal at a senior competition came at the 'European Open Sofia' in January 2016 as he won the bronze after he defeated Sam Van't Westende of the Netherlands.
On November 11, 2016, Butbul participated in the under 23 European Championship in Tel Aviv and won the silver in the 73 kg weight category after losing to Hidayet Heydarov of Azerbaijan in the final.

On February 11, 2017, Butbul took part at the prestigious Paris Grand Slam for the first time and won a bronze medal. In the quarter-final match he defeated local French Loïc Korval but lost in the semi-final to Japan's Soichi Hashimoto. He then battled for the bronze against Giyosjon Boboev of Uzbekistan and won after he got a Waza-ari in golden score time.

In April 2017, Butbul won the bronze medal at the Antalya Grand Prix after he defeated Rok Drakšič of Slovenia. Butbul participated in the 2017 European Championships held in Warsaw and finished in 5th place after he lost in the semi-final to Russia's Musa Mogushkov and in the bronze medal match to Tommy Macias of Sweden. On June 17, he won the silver medal at the Cancún Grand Prix. On October 27, he took part in the Abu Dhabi Grand Slam and won a bronze medal.

Butbul represents Israel at the 2020 Summer Olympics. Competing in the men's 73 kg weight category, Butbul was to start his  competition fighting the winner of a match between Algerian Fethi Nourine and Sudanese Mohamed Abdalarasool – who both withdrew instead of facing an Israeli opponent in order to express solidarity with Palestine. Advancing without a fight to the round of 16, Butbul faced Moldova's Victor Sterpu, the 2020 European champion, and beat him with an ippon. At the quarterfinals, he lost to the South Korean 2018 world champion An Chang-rim, keeping a chance to win bronze through the repechage. Losing in the repechage to the Canadian 2016 Pan American champion Arthur Margelidon, Butbul finished the competition in seventh place.

He won one of the bronze medals in his event at the 2022 Judo Grand Slam Tel Aviv held in Tel Aviv, Israel.

Titles
Source:

References

External links

 
 
 Tohar Butbul at the European Judo Union
 

1994 births
Living people
Israeli male judoka
Jewish martial artists
Jewish Israeli sportspeople
Judoka at the 2019 European Games
European Games competitors for Israel
Israeli Sephardi Jews
Israeli Mizrahi Jews
Judoka at the 2020 Summer Olympics
Medalists at the 2020 Summer Olympics
Olympic medalists in judo
Olympic bronze medalists for Israel
Olympic judoka of Israel
Olympic Games controversies
21st-century Israeli people